Sultanpur National Park (Ramsar site )(formerly Sultanpur Bird Sanctuary) is located at Sultanpur village on Gurugram-Jhajjar highway, 15 km from Gurugram, Haryana and 50 km from Delhi in India. This covers approximately 142.52 hectares.

Introduction 
Sultanpur Bird Sanctuary is a very popular national park of India. Located in Sultanpur village, Farukhnagar, Gurugram district in Haryana state. Sultanpur village is located 40 km from Dhaula Kuan in Delhi and 15 km from Gurugram city on the Gurugram – Jhajjar highway.  This bird sanctuary, ideal for birding and bird lookers, is best visited in winters when many migratory birds come here.

Haryana government has carried out a number of development works at Sultanpur Bird Sanctuary like construction of mounds, widening of paths, and digging four tube wells. Efforts are being made to improve vegetation in the area by planting more trees, which are popular with the birds like ficus spp. Acacia Nilotica, Acacia Tortilis, Beris and Neem.

Among approximately 1,800 migratory bird species out of total approximately 9,000-10,000 species of birds in the world, nearly three thousand species migrate to India due to seasonal changes, including 175 long-distance migration species that use the Central Asian Flyway route which also include Amur falcons, Egyptian vultures, plovers, ducks, storks, ibises, flamingos, jacanas, pochards and sociable lapwing. Among these approximately 250 species of Birds are found at Sultanpur Bird Sanctuary. Some of them are resident, while others come from distant regions like Siberia, Europe and Afghanistan.

Some of the resident birds are common hoopoe, paddyfield pipit, purple sunbird, little cormorant, pigeons, Indian myna, Eurasian thick-knee, gray francolin, black francolin, Indian roller, white-throated kingfisher, spot billed duck, painted stork, white ibis, black headed ibis, little egret, great egret, cattle egret, and the India crested lark.

Every year more than 100 migratory bird species arrive at Sultanpur in search of feeding grounds and to pass the winter. In winter, the sanctuary provides a picturesque panorama of migratory birds such as Siberian cranes, greater flamingo, ruff, black winged stilt, common teal, common greenshank, northern pintail, yellow wagtail, white wagtail, northern shoveller, rosy pelican.

Climate 
This Bird Sanctuary, ideal for birding and bird watchers, is best visited in winters when a large number of migratory birds come here. Sultanpur has the typical North Indian climate of harsh summers (up to 46 °C) and cold winters (low of up to 9 °C). The rainy season is short, from July to the end of August.

History

Medieval history
Sultanpur is named after Chauhan Rajput raja Sultan Singh Chauhan, a great grandson of Harsh Dev Singh Chauhan. Harsh was one of 21 sons of king Sangat Singh Chauhan. Raja Sangat Singh was a great-grandnephew of king Prithviraj Chauhan (reign. c. 1178–1192 CE ) according to historical recorded by British raj Indian civil servant and historian Henry Elliot (1817-1907). Raja Sultan Singh Chauhan established Sultanpur in 1474 Vikram Samwat (1417 or 1418 CE) after wresting it from Silar Muslims. Silar Muslims, a branch of Oghuz Turks, originated from the invader Mahmud of Ghazni's (971 – 1030 CE) nephew Ghazi Saiyyad Salar Masud (1014 – 1034 CE) buried in Bahraich in Uttar Pradesh. Sultanpur was the biggest village (covering 52000 bighas of land) under Farrukhnagar and many of the present day villages around it have originated as dhanis i.e. temporary farmer's shelters within the "lal dora" revenue boundary of Sultanpur.

The region around Sultanpur was called Dhundhoti. Sultanpur was the center of salt production for use in Delhi and the United Provinces of British India till the late 19th century exporting annually 250000 quintals (680000 maunds) over the Rajputana-Malwa Railway. The Farrukhnagar railway station and metre-gauge railway train service was started on 14 February 1873, and there were a couple of railway sidings at Sultanpur for loading salt into the train wagons. Sultanpur had an ancient mosque dating back to the period of Sultan of Delhi, Ghiyas ud din Balban (1200–1287 CE). Two slabs of red sandstone bearing Arabic inscriptions taken from this mosque are fixed on the southern wall of the Jama Masjid at Farrukhnagar. The foundation of this mosque was clearly visible a few decades ago as per old residents of Sultanpur.

Salt was produced by extracting brine from about 40 saline water wells using bullocks and drying in open plots. Since salt was one of the major sources of Government revenue, the office of the salt superintendent at Sultanpur supervised the levy of ₹2 tax per maund. With the levy of the heavy salt tax and acquisition of the Sambhar, Rajasthan salt works in Rajputana by the British Indian Government the Sultanpur Salt became uneconomical and by 1903-04 the salt industry was struggling for survival with salt export having fallen to 65000 maunds leading to severe setback to the economy of the Sultanpur area. Finally, in 1923 the British shut down the office of the salt superintendent, had all the mounds of salt thrown back into the wells and shut down the salt industry leading to considerable economic misery to the people.

Establishment of bird sanctuary 
As a bird sanctuary it was the find of Peter Michel Jackson, famous British ornithologist, and honorary secretary of the Delhi Birdwatching Society, who wrote to Prime Minister of India, Indira Gandhi,  founder of the society, in 1970 about the need to declare the Sultanpur jheel near Delhi, a bird sanctuary, and she asked him to take her there.

She had to cancel at the last minute, but later instructed then Chief Minister of Haryana, Bansi Lal, to protect the wetland, as a result the area was declared a Bird sanctuary in 1972. In July 1991 the reserve was upgraded to a National Park. It has an area of 1.43 km².

Out of total 10,005 species of birds in the world, nearly 370 species migrate to India due to seasonal changes, including 175 long-distance migration species that use the Central air Asian Flyway route,
and among those over 250 species of birds have been sighted at this protected area.

Earlier before the construction of bandhs and drainage areas around Sultanpur remained waterlogged and attracted a large numbers of migratory birds and hunters, many from the Diplomatic Corps at Delhi. Now however the bird sanctuary is artificially revived using pumped water from the Yamuna.

Visitors are required to pay a ₹5.00 entry fee and show identity card to visit Sultanpur National Park.

Resident birds 

Resident birds include the common hoopoe, paddyfield pipit, purple sunbird, little cormorant, Indian cormorant, common spoonbill, grey francolin, black francolin, Indian roller, white-throated kingfisher, Indian spot-billed duck, painted stork, black-necked stork, white ibis, black-headed ibis, little egret, great egret, cattle egret, crested lark, red-vented bulbul, rose-ringed parakeet, red-wattled lapwing, shikra, Eurasian collared dove, red collared dove, laughing dove, spotted owlet, rock pigeon, magpie robin, greater coucal, weaver bird, bank mynah, common mynah and Asian green bee-eater.

Migratory birds 
Every year over a hundred migratory bird species visit here to feed. In winter the sanctuary provides is a panorama of migratory birds such as Siberian crane, greater flamingo, ruff, black-winged stilt, Eurasian teal, common greenshank, northern pintail, yellow wagtail, white wagtail, northern shoveller, rosy pelican, spot-billed pelican, gadwall, wood sandpiper, spotted sandpiper, Eurasian wigeon, black-tailed godwit, spotted redshank, starling, bluethroat and long-billed pipit. In summer about 11 species of migratory birds such as Asian koel, black-crowned night heron, grey heron, Indian golden oriole, knob-billed duck, blue-cheeked bee-eater, blue-tailed bee-eater and cuckoos come here.

In addition to the many birds, animals such as blue bull, Indian Fox and black buck are also seen here. Trees which are popular with the birds like acacia nilotica, acacia tortilis, berberis and neem have been planted.

Facilities 
The park is a popular picnic spot for residents of New Delhi and the NCR (National Capital Region), especially during the winter migration months when thousands of birds visit here from across the globe. To encourage winged creature watching, there are four watch towers (machans) situated at various focuses. Moreover, there is satisfactory stopping and offices like washroom and drinking water. The Educational Interpretation Center has been built up here to offer appropriate direction to the adventurers visiting the spot and  a library, films, slides and binoculars for the benefit of bird lovers. A walk along the perimeter of the park takes up to two hours. There is a room dedicated to the memory of Dr. Salim Ali, which contains his bust, photographs, write ups, and some of his personal effects. There is public parking, bathrooms, drinking water facilities and a children's park in the reserve. For those wishing to stay overnight, the park also has a well-appointed guest house with all amenities.

Image gallery

See also 

 National Parks & Wildlife Sanctuaries of Haryana
 Indian Council of Forestry Research and Education
 Arid Forest Research Institute
 Okhla Sanctuary, bordering Delhi in adjoining Uttar Pradesh
 Nearby Najafgarh drain bird sanctuary, Delhi
 Nearby Najafgarh lake or Najafgarh jheel (Now completely drained by Najafgarh drain)
 National Zoological Park Delhi
 Asola Bhatti Wildlife Sanctuary, Delhi
 Bhalswa horseshoe lake, Delhi
 Bhindawas Wildlife Sanctuary
 Basai wetland
 Haryana Tourism
 List of Monuments of National Importance in Haryana
 List of State Protected Monuments in Haryana
 List of Indus Valley Civilization sites in Haryana, Punjab, Rajasthan, Gujrat, India & Pakistan
 List of national parks of India
 Wildlife sanctuaries of India

References

External links 
 Sultanpur National Park at birding.in
 The Sultanpur Photo Log
 How Sultanpur happened: Sultanpur and Najafgarh Jheels, by Peter Jackson
 Sultanpur National Park – Eco-sensitive Zone; MINISTRY of Environment, Forest and Climate Change Notification, New Delhi, 29 January 2009 – [To be published in the Gazette of India, Extraordinary, part II, Section 3, Subsection (ii)], [F.No. 30/1/2008-ESZ], By Dr. G. V. Subrahmanyam, Scientist ‘G’]

National parks in Haryana
Bird sanctuaries of India
Protected areas established in 1972
Gurgaon district
Lakes of Haryana
1972 establishments in Haryana
Ramsar sites in India